Adharm is a 1992 Bollywood drama film directed by Aziz Sejawal and produced by Nitin Manmohan. The film stars an ensemble cast. The story was written by Javed Siddiqui.

Cast
Shatrughan Sinha as Avinash Verma
Shabana Azmi as Mamta Verma
Sanjay Dutt as Vicky Verma
Anita Raj as Sara D'Souza
Shakti Kapoor as Makhan Singh
Gulshan Grover as Rocky Verma
Paresh Rawal as Raghunath Verma
Kiran Kumar as Jagannath 'Jagan' Verma  
Asrani
Avtar Gill as Inspector D'Souza
Vikram Gokhale as Mr. Verma
Mac Mohan as Rafiq
Rakesh Pandey as Bharat Verma
Tej Sapru as Pratap Verma

Music

The music of the film is composed by Anand–Milind and lyrics are penned by Sameer.

References

External links

1990s Hindi-language films
1992 films
Films scored by Anand–Milind
Films directed by Aziz Sejawal